Lumen Monteiro  (born 1 February 1952) is an Indian prelate of the Catholic Church, who serves as a bishop of the Diocese of Agartala.

Early life 
Monteiro was born in 1952 in Calangute, Goa, India.

Priesthood 
Monteiro joined the Congregation of the Holy Cross and professed his vows on 30 May 1974 and was ordained as a priest on 28 Oct 1980 in the Congregation of Holy Cross.

Episcopate 
Pope John Paul II appointed Monteiro Bishop of Agartala on 11 Jan 1996 and he received his episcopal consecration on 26 May 1996. His episcopal motto is "Lead Us Onward." He chairs the North Eastern Diocesan Social Forum and as a representative of the Conference of Catholic Bishops of India (Latin rite) on the Governing Body of Caritas India.

See also 
Catholic Church in India

References

External links 

1952 births
Living people
Congregation of Holy Cross bishops
21st-century Roman Catholic bishops in India
Scholars from Goa
People from North Goa district
20th-century Roman Catholic bishops in India